T. J. Gnanavel is an Indian film director and writer, who has worked predominantly in the Tamil film industry. He is best known for directing Jai Bhim (2021). Gnanavel made his debut in 2011, writing the story and screenplay of the crime action Payanam. He next associated with Prakash Raj for the latter's directorial venture Dhoni (2012), which he wrote the dialogues for. In 2017, he made his directorial debut with the comedy Kootathil Oruthan, starring Ashok Selvan and Priya Anand in pivotal roles. Gnanavel not only directed the film but also wrote the story, screenplay and dialogues.

Filmography

References

External links
 

Indian film directors
Tamil film directors
Living people
Year of birth missing (living people)